18Doors is a national non-profit organization that provides assistance to interfaith families.

The predecessor to 18Doors was an online magazine founded in 1998 with a focus on helping Jewish interfaith families. In 2001, it was renamed InterfaithFamily and expanded its content to news and resources relevant to the interfaith community. In February 2020, it was renamed 18Doors. In addition to their online magazine, their activities have expanded to provide training and clergy to assist interfaith families in reconnecting with being Jewish and Judaism. The organization developed the Rukin fellowship program to appoint rabbis from the Reform, Conservative, Reconstructionist and Humanist movements to coordinate its interfaith efforts nationwide (as of April 2021, they had fellows in 22 American cities).

References

Jewish magazines published in the United States
Jews and Judaism in Massachusetts
Magazines published in Massachusetts
Magazines established in 2001
Magazines established in 2020
Local interest magazines published in the United States
Interfaith marriage